James Everett Saxton Jr. (May 21, 1940 – May 28, 2014) was an All-American football  and College Hall of Fame player for the University of Texas and a finalist for the 1961 Heisman Trophy. He played one year of professional football, winning one AFL Championship with the 1962 Dallas Texans.

College Football
Though he never took a snap in high school, Texas coach Darrell Royal envisioned Saxton as a quarterback, and so during his freshman and sophomore years that was the position he played. Though in 1959, Texas would have no fewer than 6 quarterbacks and Saxton would see the least playing time of all of them.

After the 1959 season, Royal asked Saxton to switch to Halfback, the prime running back in the Winged-T formation and Saxton agreed. The following season, he led the Longhorns in rushing.

In his senior season, Saxton and the Longhorns broke out. That season, he set the school and Southwest Conference record for yards per carry, became Texas' first consensus All-American running back and finished third in Heisman voting behind Syracuse's Ernie Davis and Ohio State's Bob Ferguson. The Longhorns, meanwhile, were ranked #1 for only the 3rd time in school history and the 1961 team was the first in school history to hold the #1 ranking for two weeks. It was the first Royal team to contend for the National Championship and went 10-1. After beating everyone but Oklahoma by at least 3 touchdowns and with only two very beatable teams left on the schedule, they seemed to be a lock to finish the season ranked #1. But they suffered their only loss in a shocking 6-0 upset at the hands of 24-point underdog TCU on a trick play, in a game that Saxton had to leave after he was knocked unconscious on a controversial knee-to-the-head early in the game. He finished his career with a win over Mississippi in the 1962 Cotton Bowl in which he set the school record for longest punt in a bowl game with a 73-yard quick kick.

Pro Football
Saxton was selected in the 11th round (146th overall) of the 1962 NFL draft by the St. Louis Cardinals and in the 10th round (75th overall) of the 1962 AFL draft by the Dallas Texans. He signed with Dallas and saw limited play with them during their AFL Championship 1962 season. He played halfback and punter and returned kickoffs while being tooled as a flanker. He punted twice in, what was at the time, the longest game in AFL/NFL history the 1962 AFL Championship game. During the 1963 off season, the Texans moved to Kansas City to become the Chiefs and Saxton declined to go with them; he only wanted to play in Texas to stay close to his business interests.

After leaving football, he went into the banking business in Austin where he worked for 27 years. During that time he was chairman of the board of Texas Commerce Bank in Austin, head of the Austin Chamber of Commerce, and chairman of the State Board of Insurance.

He died of dementia on May 28, 2014 and was buried on the shores of Red Lake near the town of Fairfield, Texas.

References

External links
College Statistics
 AFL Statistics

1940 births
2014 deaths
American football halfbacks
Dallas Texans (AFL) players
Texas Longhorns football players
All-American college football players
College Football Hall of Fame inductees
People from Bryan, Texas
Players of American football from Texas
Deaths from dementia in Texas